André-Jean Festugière O.P. (15 March 1898, Paris – 13 August 1982, Saint-Dizier) was a French Dominican friar, philosopher, philologist, and expert on Neoplatonism, and in particular the works of Proclus. He is also notable for his translation of the works attributed to Hermes Trismegistus.

1898 births
1982 deaths
Scholars of ancient Greek philosophy
French Dominicans
French male poets
Recipients of the Pour le Mérite (civil class)
Corresponding Fellows of the British Academy